"Wannagirl" is a song originally recorded by Trey Lorenz. Also known as "Wanna Girl". Lorenz' rendition had been released in 1992 as a B-side on the European versions of his single, "Someone to Hold."

Jeremy Jordan cover

"Wannagirl" was covered by Jeremy Jordan and released in the spring of 1993. It was the follow-up single from his debut album Try My Love on Giant Records. It was co-written by Keith Thomas, who produced both versions.

Jordan's version of "Wannagirl" became an international hit, peaking in the US at #28 on the Billboard Hot 100 and #25 on Cash Box.

Background harmonies were retained from the original recording, but vocals were added by Audrey Wheeler, Chris Rodriguez, Cindy Mizelle and Emanuel Officer as well as some from Lorenz. Both versions are almost identical from a production standpoint, but the newer version features an extra breakdown and a different vocal arrangement starting at the 3:15 mark.

A music video was released to promote the song.

In Japan, the single was released as a double A-side single with "The Right Kind of Love".

Track listing
US maxi-single

Wannagirl (Preferredgirl Mix)	3:59
Wannagirl (Streetgirl Mix)	6:06
Wannagirl (Streetgirl Instrumental)	5:29
Wannagirl (A Cappella Mix)	4:31
Wannagirl (Album Mix)	4:30

Japan mini single

Wannagirl (Preferredgirl Mix)	3:59
The Right Kind of Love (Main Mix)	4:30

Charts

References

External links
  (Jeremy Jordan)
  (Trey Lorenz)

1993 singles
1992 singles
1992 songs
Giant Records (Warner) singles
Trey Lorenz songs
Songs written by Keith Thomas (record producer)
Songs written by Tony Haynes
Song recordings produced by Keith Thomas (record producer)